Morpeth was an electoral district of the Legislative Assembly in the Australian state of New South Wales, created in 1859 and partly replacing Northumberland Boroughs and including Morpeth. It was abolished in 1894, and divided between Gloucester, Durham and East Maitland.

Members for Morpeth

Election results

References

Former electoral districts of New South Wales
Constituencies established in 1859
Constituencies disestablished in 1904
1859 establishments in Australia
1904 disestablishments in Australia